Christine is feminine given name of Greek origin.  It is a name in regular usage in French, English, German, Scandinavian, Dutch, Irish, and Scottish cultures, and it is often associated with the meaning "Follower of Christ." Variants include: Christina, Kristin, Kristina, Kristine, Kristen, Kirsten, Khrystyna (Ukraine), Krystyna (Poland), Kristiina (Estonia & Finland), and Cristina (Spain, Portugal, Central & South America).

In Estonia and Finland, the cognate is Kristiina. It is a popular name; for example, in 1968, it was the 14th most frequently-given name for girls in the United States.

Translations
 کریستین (Persian)
 كريستين (Arabic)
 Крысціна (Kryścina) (Belarusian)
 খ্রীস্টিন (Khrīsṭina) (Bengali)
 Hristina (Bosnian)
 Кристин (Kristin) (Bulgarian)
 Χριστίνα (Christina, Hristina) (Greek)
 ક્રિસ્ટીન (Krisṭīna) (Gujarati)
 כריסטין (Hebrew)
 क्रिस्टीन (Krisṭīna) (Hindi)
 Cristina (Italian)
 クリスティーヌ (Kurisutīnu), クリスティーン　(Kurisutīn) (Japanese)
 克莉丝汀(kèlìsītīng) (Chinese)
 கிரிஸ்தீன் (Krisṭin) (Tamil)
 ಕ್ರಿಸ್ಟಿನ್ (Krisṭin) (Kannada)
 크리스틴 (Keuriseutin) (Korean)
 Кристин (Kristin) (Macedonian)
 क्रिस्टिन (Krisṭina) (Nepali)
 کریستین (Persian)
 Krystyna (Polish)
 Kristýna (Czech)
 Kristína (Slovakian)
 Кристина, Христина (Kristina, Khristina) (Russian)
 Cristina (Kristina) (Spanish)
 Cristine (Tagalog)
 Kristīne (Latvian)
 קריסטין (Krystyn) (Yiddish)
 ქრისტინე (Georgian)
 Христина (Ukrainian)
 Kristina (Lithuanian)
 Krisztina (Hungarian)

Sense and origin of the name
Generally, the name Christine or Christina is given in Christ's honor and in reference to Saint Christina of Bolsena (feast day: 24 July). There are other saints named Christine or Christina, including Christine of Persia (feast day: 13-14 March); Christina of Ancyra (feast day: 18 May), et alia.

People with the given name Christine
 All pages beginning with Christine

Saints
 Saint Christina of Bolsena: feast day on 24 July
 Saint Christina of Persia: feast day, 13-14 March
 Saint Christina of Ancyra: feast day, 18 May

In academia
 Christine Bachoc (born 1964), French mathematician
 Christine L. Clouser, American virologist 
 Christine Drea, a biologist and ecologist
 Christine Gardner, an American professor
 Christine Guenther, American mathematician
 Christine Heitsch, American mathematician
 Christine Hunter, American clinical psychologist and military officer
Christine Paulin-Mohring (born 1962), French mathematician and computer scientist
 Christine de Pizan (1364 – c. 1430), French writer
 Christine Figgener, German marine biologist and science communicator

In government and politics
 Christine Adjobi, an Ivorian politician and physician
 Christine Albanel (born 1955), a French civil servant, former Minister for Culture and Communication
Christine Antorini (born 1965), Danish Minister of Education
 Christine Arguello (born 1955), a federal judge on the United States District Court for the District of Colorado
Christine Aschbacher (born 1983), Austrian politician
 Dame Christine Beasley (born 1944), British nurse and NHS healthcare administrator
Christine Boutin (born 1944), French politician, former Minister of Housing and Urban Development, former representative of Yvelines
Christine Boyle, Canadian politician
Christine Butler (1943–2017), British politician 
Christine Chapman (born 1956), Welsh politician
Christine de Veyrac (born 1959), French politician
Christine Decodts (born 1966), French politician
Christine Elliott (born 1955), Canadian politician
Christine Grahame (born 1944), British politician
Christine Gregoire (born 1947), American politician from Washington state
 Christine Grice, New Zealand lawyer and jurist
 Christine Gwyther (born 1959), Welsh politician
Christine Hogarth, Canadian politician
Christine Humphreys, Welsh politician
Christine Jardine (born 1960), British politician
Christine Johnson (born 1968), American politician from Utah
Christine Johnson (born 1960), American politician from Illinois
Christine Jönsson (born 1958), Swedish politician
Christine Labrie, Canadian politician
 Christine Lagarde (born 1956), Managing Director of the International Monetary Fund
Christine Lambrecht (born 1965), German politician
Christine Lieberknecht (born 1958), a German politician
Christine McCafferty (born 1945), British politician
Christine Melnick (born 1950), Canadian politician
Christine Moore (born 1983), Canadian politician
Christine Normandin, Canadian politician
Christine O'Donnell (born 1969), American activist
Christine Poulin, Canadian politician from Montreal
Christine Razanamahasoa, Malagasy politician
Christine Russell (born 1945), British politician
Christine Schwarz-Fuchs (born 1974), Austrian entrepreneur and politician
Christine Sinicki (born 1960), American politician
Christine Stewart (1941–2015), Canadian politician
Christine St-Pierre (born 1958), Canadian politician and journalist
 Christine Teunissen (born 1985), a Dutch Senator
 Christine A. Varney (born 1955), an American lawyer; former U.S. Assistant Attorney General for Antitrust at the United States Department of Justice and Commissioner of the Federal Trade Commission
Christine Todd Whitman (born 1946), American politician
Christine Wohlwend (born 1978), Liechtensteiner politician

Females in sports
 Christine Adams (athlete) (born 1974), a German pole vaulter
 Christine Amertil (born 1979,) a Bahamian athlete competing mainly in the 400 metres
 Christine Arron (born 1973), a track and field sprint athlete, competing internationally for France
 Christine Bannon-Rodrigues (born 1966), an American martial artist and actress
 Christine Beck (born 1974), a German football referee and former player
 Christine Boudrias (born 1972), a Canadian short track speed skater who competed in the 1994 & 1998 Winter Olympics
 Christine Brennan (born 1958), an American sports columnist, TV and radio commentator, and speaker
 Christine Cook (born 1970), a retired field hockey defender from England
 Christine Envall (born 1972), an Australian professional bodybuilder
 Christine Girard (born 1985), a Canadian weightlifter who was the first Canadian female to win a medal in weightlifting
 Christine Mboma (born 2003), a Namibian runner
 Christine Nesbitt (born 1985), a retired Canadian long track speed skater and former Olympic 1000m champion
 Christine Ohuruogu (born 1984), a British track and field athlete and former Olympic 400m Champion
 Christine Truman (born 1941), a British tennis player and French Open Champion
 Christine Sinclair (born 1983), a Canadian football player who is currently a member of the Canadian National Soccer Team

Males in sports
 Christine Michael (born 1990), an American football player running back

In entertainment
 Christine Adams (born 1974), an English actress
 Christine Keiko Agena, (born 1973), a Japanese-American actress
 Christine Amor (born 1952), an Australian actress
 Christine Andreas (born 1951), an American actress and singer
 Christine Angot (born 1959), a French writer, novelist and playwright
 Christine Anu (born 1970), an Australian pop singer
 Christine Arnothy (1930–2015), a French writer
 Christine Auten (born 1969), an American voice actress and script-writer
 Christine Baranski (born 1952), an American stage and screen actress
 Christine Barkhuizen le Roux (1959–2020), South African writer
 Christine Beatty (born 1958), an American writer, musician and transgender activist
 Christine Bleakley (born 1979), a Northern Irish television presenter
 Christine Bottomley (born 1979), a British actress
 Christine Brewer (born 1955), an American soprano
 Christine Brodbeck (born 1950), Swiss dancer and author
 Christine Brooke-Rose (1923–2012), a British writer and literary critic
 Christine Brubaker, Canadian actor and director
 Christine Cavanaugh (1963–2014), American voice actress
 Christine Evangelista (born 1986), an American actress
 Christine Fernandes (born 1968), a Brazilian actress
 Christine Hà (born 1979), an American chef, writer, and TV host
 Christine Lahti (born 1950), an actress and film director
 Christine Lakin (born 1979), an American actress
 Christine and the Queens, or Chris; stage-name of Héloïse Adélaïde Letissier (born 1988), French musician and producer
 Christine McVie (1943–2022), a British rock singer, keyboardist and songwriter
 Christine Neubauer (born 1962), a German actress 
 Christine Ockrent (born 1944), Belgian journalist and presenter of French television
 Christine Roche (born 1939), French-Canadian illustrator, cartoonist, teacher and filmmaker
 Christine Shevchenko (born 1988), Ukrainian-American ballet dancer
 Christine Taylor (born 1971), an American actress
 Christine Woods (born 1983), an American actress

Other 
 Christine Butegwa, Ugandan feminist activist and writer
 Christine Bycroft, New Zealand statistician and demographer
 Christine Chubbuck (1944–1974), American news reporter who committed suicide on live television
 Christine Donnelly, founder and CEO of the Aboriginal Dance Theatre Redfern in Sydney, Australia
 Christine Falling, American serial killer 
 Christine Peterson, American forecaster
 Christine "Chris" Sizemore, American woman with dissociative identity disorder, inspired book The Three Faces of Eve
 Christine Wiedinmyer, research scientist in the Atmospheric Chemistry Division of the National Center for Atmospheric Research

Fictional characters
 Christine Appleby in the ITV soap opera Coronation Street
 Christine Blair in the CBS soap opera The Young and the Restless
 Christine Campbell, the title character of the CBS sitcom The New Adventures of Old Christine
 Christine Carpenter, a minor character in the soap opera Hollyoaks
 Christine Chapel in the original Star Trek series and related films
 Christine Daaé, the female lead in The Phantom of the Opera, originally a novel by Gaston Leroux.
 Christine "Chris" Hargensen, antagonist of Stephen King's Carrie 
 Christine Morris in a book series by Maureen Jennings
 Christine Malone, a character in the video games TimeSplitters and TimeSplitters: Future Perfect
 Christine Mulgrew, a character in the BBC drama Waterloo Road
 Christine Nelson aka "Spike" in Degrassi
 Christine Penmark in William March's novel The Bad Seed
 Christine Weiring, the title character of the 1958 film Christine
 Christine in Toni Morrison's novel Love
 Christine, novel by Stephen King about a demonic car; a 1983 film adaptation was produced
 Christine Booth, the daughter of Dr. Temperance Brennan and Seeley Booth in the TV show Bones

See also
 Christine (disambiguation)
 Christina (disambiguation)

References

jp:クリスティーヌ

Given names
Given names of Greek language origin
Greek feminine given names
English feminine given names
Filipino feminine given names
French feminine given names
German feminine given names
Swiss feminine given names